Peyad //peɪjɑd//  is a place located in the suburb of Thiruvananthapuram, the capital city of Kerala state in India. The offices of Vilappil Grama Panchayath and Vilappil Village are situated at Peyad.

Geography
Peyad is located at 8°30′29″N 76°59′54″E

Location
Peyad is located very close to the capital city of Kerala- Thiruvananthapuram on the east side of the city. Peyad can be reached from Thiruvananthapuram city centre by 4 different road routes.  viz. via  Karamana or Jagathy or Pangode (Through Army Cantonment area) or Sasthamangalam(PTP Nagar) routes. Peyad main junction is on the main road connecting Thiruvananthapuram city to Kattakada. Peyad junction, from where two roads lead to two different directions, the east road leads to Kattakada, Neyyattinkara, Vellarada, Neyyar Dam, and the north road leading to Vilappilshala, Puliyarakonam, Vellanadu, and so son.

Peyad is about 9 km away from Thiruvananthapuram city center. Regular bus services are available from Thiruvananthapuram Central Bus Station at Thampanoor or City Bus Station at East Fort.

Thiruvananthapuram Central Railway Station is the nearest railhead (10 km) and the nearest airport is Thiruvananthapuram International Airport(13 km).

Other Features
Peyad is a residential area in the suburb of Trivandrum city a commercial junction in the Trivandrum-Kattakkada route. The land of Peyad is situated on the banks of the Karamana river. Aruvippuram, Kavadikkadavu, Pirayil Kovilkadavu and Kundamankadavu are river banks of Karamana river near to Peyad. What makes Peyad geographically important is its proximity to Trivandrum city center, the capital of Kerala. From Peyad main junction, Trivandrum Central Railway Station, Kerala Government Secretariat, Kerala Legislative Assembly, Kerala Raj Bhavan are just 9 km away and Trivandrum International Airport is just 13 KM away. Sri Padmanabha Swami Temple, Thiruvananthapuram is just 10 km away from Peyad.  Trivandrum Technopark, the IT Hub of Kerala is 22 km northwest of Peyad and the Vizhinjam International Container Transhipment Terminal is also just 22 KM south of Peyad.  Peyad has a better public bus transportation facility with Trivandrum City and with most of the places in the eastern part of Trivandrum District. As the main road connecting Trivandrum to Kattakkada and several other places like Vellanad, Aryanad, Vellarada is passing through Peyad, regular public transportation bus services are available to reach Peyad from Trivandrum Central Bus station at Thampanoor and City Bus Station (KSRTC & Private city buses) at East Fort, Trivandrum. A Main Post Office of the Indian Postal Department which comes under the postal circle of Neyyattinkara region is working at Peyad (PIN 695573) with four sub-post offices at Moongode, Perukavu, Puliyarakonam & Vilappilsalai which are satellite places of Peyad. Peyad is being urbanized rapidly in recent two decades and most of the agricultural land in Peyad has already been converted to residential areas in the past 2 decades. Various villa projects and residential flats are still under construction here. Peyad was famous for sawmills selling imported woods from foreign countries.  Malackal Timbers and Sawmill situated near Peyad junction is the largest Saw Mill and wood seller.  Peyad junction, Peyad Market Junction Peyad Pallimukku junction, Thachottukavu junction are major commercial centers. Thachottukavu junction is famous for grocery shops.  There is a private fish market in Peyad market junction. SP Theatre and Convention Centre is situated near to Peyad main junction.

Notable persons

 Jagathy Sreekumar- Malayalam film actor has been living here for the past 20 years
 Bharath Gopi- Erstwhile Malayalam film actor spent his last years in life at Peyad
 Sreekumaran Thampi- Malayalam film director and lyricist is residing here
 Kochu Preman- Malayalam film actor belongs to Valiyavila near Peyad

Prominent Educational Institutions
 APJ Abdul Kalam Technological University Headquarters and Main Campus is under construction at Nedumkuzhi near Peyad
 Carmel CBSE School Vittiyam, Peyad
 Saraswathi Arts and Science College, Vilappilsalai
 St. Xaviers' Higher Secondary School, Peyad, Thiruvananthapuram
 N S S H S Chowalloor, Puliyarakonam
 Shantiniketan CBSE Higher Secondary School, Kunnumpuram
 Kannasa Mission High School, Peyad
 VIJAY School, Kattuvila, Peyad 
 Green Valley International School, Near EMS Academy, Kavuvila Road, Vilappilsala. Read more on http://www.greenvalleyschools.in
 SIP academy peyad
 AVR School of Kindergarten, Peyad
 New Chempaka play school
 Rajiv Gandhi National School, Moongode
 Sathya Sai School, Puliyarakonam

Other institutions near to Peyad 

 EMS Academy, Vilappilsalai
 Laurie Baker Centre, Vilappilsalai
 Asianet Studio, Puliyarakonam
 Terumo Penpol Limited, Puliyarakonam - a subsidiary of Terumo Corp., Japan ( India's largest blood bag manufacturer)
 ALIND-RELAYS DIVISION (The Aluminium Industries Limited), Kavinpuram

Health Centres and Hospitals 

 SK Hospital, Peyad (Branch of SK Hospital, Idapazhanji)
 Kripa Hospital, Peyad
 SS Dental Clinic, Pallimukku, Peyad
 Abhayagramam Rehabilitation Center, Manchadi
 Matha Ayurveda Eye Hospital, Moongode
 Government Community Health Center, Vilappilsalai
 Travancore Hospital, Thachottukavu Junction
 Sanjeevani Siddha Ayurveda Hospital, Moongodu Road
 Government Homoeo Hospital, Perukavu
 DDRC SRL Diagnostics Private Limited, Peyad
 Ashwas Lab, Peyad

Major Commercial Shops
Medical Stores
 Mahesh Medicals, Peyad
 Nakshatra Medicals, Peyad
 Karunya Medicals, Peyad
 Sai Medicals, Peyad
 Wills Medicals, Peyad
 Kukku Medicals, Peyad
 Ashwas Pharmacy, Peyad
 Amma Medicals, Peyad
 Jan Oushadhi Pharmacy, Peyad
Jewelers
 Muhoortham Jwellers, Peyad
 Pavithram Jewelers, Peyad
 Sreedevi Jewelers, Peyad
Textiles
 Raja Textiles, Peyad
 Supreme Textiles, Peyad
 TG Textiles, Thachottukavu junction
Furniture
 Bharath Furniture, Pallimukku, Peyad
 Uthradam Industries, Peyad
Paint/Hardware/Plumbing etc
 Noble paint and hardware shop Peyad
 Lalitha Enterprises, Peyad
 Pooja paint and hardware, Peyad
Restaurants 
 Irani Fast Food, Peyad
 Salmania Restaurant, Peyad
 Hotel Mabrooq, Peyad
 Hotel Arowna, Peyad
 Lamiya Fast Food, Kundamanbhagam, Peyad
 Saseendra Hotel, Peyad Jn
Pets/Animals/Aquarium etc
 Amigo, Pallimukku, Peyad
 Smart Petco Petshop, Market Junction, Peyad
 Commando Dogs Hostel & Training Centre, Peyad
 Royal Pet food shop, Peyad Jn
 Chettan Aquarium, Market Jn, Peyad
 Sunny, Pallimukku, Peyad

Other shops 
 Mobile Care, Peyad
 Jay & Co Watch Repairing, Peyad
 Raja Metals
 Malackal Saw Mill, Peyad
 Ganga Fancy, Peyad
 Sha Bakery, Peyad
 Malu's Beauty Parlour & Collections
 Munna Supermarket, Peyad
 Kairali Studio, Peyad Junction
 Family Bakers, Peyad
 Vihan Bakery, Peyad
 Grand Bakery, Peyad
 Ibwis Supermarket, Peyad

Religious
Hindu Temples
 Ujjaini Mahakali Amman Kovil, Peyad
 Thachottukavu Sree Dharma Sastha Temple (Devaswom Board)
 Kavuvila Thampuram Temple 
 Alanthrakonam Sree Thampuran Durga Devi khetram
 Sree Alakunnam Devi Kshetram, Cheelapara
 Durga Devi Temple, Karamkottukonam
 Thazhechirakkal Durga Parameswari kshethram
 Chirakonam Sree Thampuran Kshetram, Chirakonam, Peyad
 Alakunnam Mudippura, Alakunnam, Peyad
 Pirayil Sree Dharma Sastha Kshetram, Peyad
 Kundamankadavu Bhadrakali Kshetram, Peyad
 Aruvipuram Sree Mahavishnu kshetram, Aruvipuram, Peyad
 Thirunelliyoor Shiva Thampuran Temple, Peyad
 Sree Bhadrakali Temple Vittiyam, Peyad
 Venugopala Kshetram, Bhajanamadom, Peyad
 Chirathala Sree Mahadeva Temple, Peyad
 Cherupara Mahavishnu Temple, Peyad
 Thazhechirakkal Durga Parameswari Kshethram
 Durga Devi Temple, Karamkottukonam
 Sree Bhadrakali Temple, Peyad
 Sreekanda Sastha Temple, Kavinpuram (Devaswom Board)
 Sreekanda Sastha Temple, Vilappilsala (Devaswom Board)

Christian Churches
 St. Xavier's Church, Peyad
 Assemblies of God Church Peyad
 Alfred Memorial CSI Church Peyad
 Pentecostal Church Vittiyam
 C S I Church Kattuvila
Islam Mosques 
 Muslim Juma Masjid, Peyad

Theater
 SP Cinemas 2K A-Class Releasing Movie Theater- (2 screens) Peyad

Sports, Games and Fitness
 Sportshood Oasis Turf, Thachottukavu
 Infinity Pro Sporting Turf, Karippur
 Sporty Monks Turf, Thachottukavu
 Smashington Indoor Badminton Court, Ezhakode, Pidaram

Auditoriums
 SP Convention Center, Peyad
 TG Auditorium, Perukavu, Peyad

Online Service Centers
 Akshaya Kendra, Market Junction, Peyad

See also
 Malayinkeezhu
 Kurisumuttom

References

External links
 About Peyad

 Suburbs of Thiruvananthapuram